Vincent Gil (1939 – 21 August 2022), also credited as Vince Gil, was an Australian film and television actor best known for his portrayal of the character Nightrider in the 1979 film Mad Max, and Stone. Gil had also starred in many Australian television shows, such as Matlock Police, Neighbours, A Country Practice and Prisoner. He also acted in theatre roles from his debut in the industry in 1963 until 2007. He died on 21 August 2022, at the age of 83.

Filmography

References

External links

1939 births
2022 deaths
20th-century Australian male actors
Australian male film actors
Australian male television actors
Male actors from Sydney